Pak Nam Pho is a tambon (sub-district) in Mueang Nakhon Sawan District, Nakhon Sawan Province, upper central Thailand.

Toponymy and history
Usually, Pak Nam Pho means Mueang Nakhon Sawan District, the capital district of Nakhon Sawan. But implicitly refers to the whole province of Nakhon Sawan. The word Pak Nam Pho is believed to be a distorted name from the word Pak Nam Phlo (ปากน้ำโผล่, "estuary emerges") due to it is the confluence of the Ping and the Nan Rivers to form the Chao Phraya River, the main artery of the central region of Thailand.

Another explanation believes that "Pho" is the former name of the Nan River, hence Pak Nam Pho means "the mouth of the Nan River", Pak Nam also spelled Paknam means "estuary" or "river mouth". Another old name of Pak Nam Pho, given by the visiting King Rama V, is Ban Yon Tawan (บ้านย้อนตะวัน), meaning "a settlement that faces the morning sun". The locals are often called Ban Chon Tawan (บ้านชอนตะวัน). In that era, even if Pak Nam Pho was a downtwon, but it is full of wild animals such as deer and tiger. Tigers often hunt deer or even village dogs for food. 

Pak Nam Pho is home to many ethnic Chinese immigrants, including Teochew, Hainan, Hoklo, Cantonese and Hakka. Until now, they still keep the traditional culture intact, such as folk music, by passing it on to the new generation. Pak Nam Pho is also the place where the grand Chinese New Year celebrations are held, with a period of up to 12 consecutive days and nights.

Administration
Pak Nam Pho is under the administration of Nakhon Sawan Municipality like other nearby sub-districts.

References

Further reading

Tambon of Nakhon Sawan Province